The Retreat is a retreat in York.

The Retreat may also refer to:

 The Retreat (Rambaud novel), 2000 novel by Patrick Rambaud
 The Retreat (Bergen novel), 2008 novel by David Bergen
 The Retreat: Hitler's First Defeat, 2009 book by Michael Jones
 The Retreat (2020 film), an American horror film
 The Retreat (2021 film), a Canadian slasher film
 "The Retreat" (She-Hulk: Attorney at Law), a 2022 television episode

See also
 Retreat (disambiguation)